The 1848 Illinois gubernatorial election was the ninth election for this office.  Democratic governor Augustus C. French was easily re-elected. This was the first gubernatorial election in Illinois that was held on the same date as the United States presidential election.

This was the first election in which any governor was elected to a second term.  The Illinois Constitution of 1818, which had been replaced this same year, prohibited more than one consecutive term as governor, and Thomas Duncan was the only governor ever to attempt a second term, though it was not consecutive.

At this time in Illinois history the Lieutenant Governor was elected on a separate ballot from the governor. This would remain so until the 1970 constitution.

Results

References

Illinois Blue Book 1899

Illinois
1848
Gubernatorial
November 1848 events